Energy tower may refer to:

electricity power generation by downdraft created by evaporation of water sprayed at the top of a tall hollow cylinder, see Energy tower (downdraft)
solar power plant technology using mirrors, see Solar power tower
electricity power generation by solar-heated air in a chimney-style tower, see Solar updraft tower
a machine for converting the kinetic energy in wind into electricity, see Wind turbine
a machine for converting the kinetic energy in wind into mechanical energy, see Windmill 
Solar Heat Pump Electrical Generation System is an attempt at applying Open Source Software Project Management to a renewable energy design project.
Energy Tower (Midland, Texas) was a 59-story, 860 foot skyscraper proposed for the city of Midland, Texas